The Bristol West byelection of 7 March 1957 was a by-election to the House of Commons which saw the constituency of Bristol West elect a new Conservative Party Member of Parliament to replace Sir Walter Monckton. Sir Walter had first been elected at a previous byelection in 1951.

Candidates
The Conservative Party chose Robert Cooke, a schoolteacher who was only 26 years old. Cooke had been President of the Oxford University Conservative Association in 1953, and was elected to Bristol City Council the next year; he had been the Conservative candidate for Bristol South East in the 1955 general election.

The Labour Party chose William Rodgers, then General Secretary of the Fabian Society, who was 28 at the time. There was no Liberal Party candidate.

Results
Robert Cooke kept the seat in the Conservative column but suffered a substantial reduction in the majority, which fell from 22,001 to 14,162. Labour retained almost all of their 1955 vote. Cooke became the "Baby of the House" (youngest member), and kept the seat until he retired at the 1979 general election. William Rodgers was not disillusioned and later became Labour Member of Parliament for Stockton-on-Tees in a 1962 byelection.

Votes

See also
 Bristol West (UK Parliament constituency)
 List of United Kingdom by-elections (1950–1979)

References

"The Times House of Commons Supplement" Issued June 1957.

1957 elections in the United Kingdom
1957 in England
West
1950s in Bristol